HUS, Chennai is an International Baccalaureate continuum school located inside House of Hiranandani, Chennai. The school was established in 2011 by Surendra Hiranandani, founder of Hiranandani Group. 

As part of the IB, the school offers classes in: Business Studies, Arts and Design, Biology, Chemistry, Economics, English Language, English Literature, Global Perspectives, Mathematics, Psychology and Physics. They also have a second Language choice of Spanish, French, Hindi, and Tamil.

Controversy 

In 2016, hundreds of parents and some teachers protested outside the school for several days over disagreements with the school's leadership. This led to the school being closed for one week. The protesters claimed there to be an anti-Indian sentiment and inappropriate language towards female members of staff. In addition, there were claims that the school would discriminate against students bringing their own food instead of using the onsite caterer, Sodexo.

Some teachers on the other hand defended the schools' leadership, citing cultural differences which may have led to misunderstandings or misinterpretations.

The school reopened after assurances had been given pending an investigation.

In 2017, CBSE disaffiliated the school, and now only the IB section remains.

See also 
Hiranandani Foundation Schools

References

External links 
 School website
 IB Continuum School

HUS Wins Top Honors at Education World Grand Jury Ranking Awards
IB School Code
Launchpad for the furture
Education World Grand Jury Ranking Awards
Education World Grand Jury Ranking Awards

Schools in Chennai
Private schools in Chennai
International Baccalaureate schools
International Baccalaureate schools in India
2011 establishments in Maharashtra
Educational institutions established in 2011